Arion is a genus of air-breathing land slugs in the family Arionidae, the roundback slugs. Most species of this Palearctic genus are native to the Iberian Peninsula.

Species can be difficult to distinguish from one another upon cursory examination, because individuals of a species can vary in color and there are few obvious differences between taxa. The color of an individual can be influenced by its diet.

Some Arion are known as pests, such as A. lusitanicus auct. non Mabille (= A. vulgaris), which damages agricultural crops and ornamental plants, and A. rufus, a familiar garden pest. Arion slugs are often transported internationally in shipments of plant products and mushrooms. Arion slugs have been identified in North America and Australia as invasive species, altering the plants of ecosystems through seed predation and competing with native slugs.

Species
There are approximately 40 species in the genus.

Species include:

 Arion ater – black slug
 Arion circumscriptus – brownbanded arion
 Arion distinctus Mabille, 1868
 Arion fasciatus
 Arion flagellus
 Arion fuscus
 Arion hortensis Férussac, 1819 – small striped slug
 Arion intermedius Normand, 1852 (syn. Arion alpinus Pollonera, 1887) – hedgehog slug
 Arion lusitanicus
 Arion obesoductus (syn. Arion alpinus auctt. non Pollonera, 1887)
 Arion occultus
 Arion owenii
 Arion rufus – red slug
 Arion silvaticus
 Arion simrothi
 Arion subfuscus
 Arion transsylvanus Simroth, 1885
 Arion vulgaris (syn. Arion lusitanicus auct. non Mabille) – Spanish slug

Also included
Arion vejdorskyi, a taxon with unclear taxonomic position

Etymology
The name Arion is from New Latin, from the Greek areíones, a “kind of snail or slug.”

References

External links 

 
Gastropod genera